Old Bazaar of Korçë is an Ottoman-era bazaar in Korçë, Albania.

Established about 500 years ago, it is composed of old Ottoman and Roman architectonic style buildings which for centuries were used as shops, guesthouses or khans. It is said to be noted for selling goats and handbags.

It was mostly rebuilt in 1879 following an extensive fire

The old bazaar comprises 138 first category culture monuments.  It is also called as the Bazaar of the Serenades, associated with the music which for centuries was composed and sung by people whilst walking with a guitar on the round cobblestone.

Renovation
In 2015 it was announced that the bazaar would be renovated and transformed into a hub for tourists visiting the city, due to a $4 million restoration project financed by the Albanian Development Fund and the Albanian American Fund for Development.

References

Commercial buildings completed in 1879
Buildings and structures in Korçë
Ottoman Albania
Retail markets in Albania
Tourist attractions in Korçë
Bazaars in Albania